Delphinium peregrinum, also commonly known as violet larkspur, is a Eurasian flowering plant, belonging to the genus Delphinium, endemic to Turkey, the Eastern Mediterranean  and Western Irano-Turanian region, bearing an erect, annual stem with glabrous compound leaves and reaching a height of 27–35 cm. The plant, which blossoms between April and August, bears five colorful sepals (calyx), petaloid, the posterior sepal spurred, the two lateral sepals and the two lower sepals without spurs; while the anterior sepals can either be fused or separated. The inflorescence (corollas) are sparsely arranged, irregular, and are borne on long pedicels subtended by bracts.

The plant is readily recognized by its deep purple to lavender-coloured flowers which resemble scorpion tails (scorpioid). Flowers are pollinated by bumblebees.

Etymology 
The taxonomic name of the genus Delphinium is derived from the Greek word delphis meaning, dolphin, as the flower's shape was thought by the ancients to resemble a dolphin. The Modern Hebrew name given for this genus (dorbanit) takes its name from the flower's pointed-tail which resembles a long spur.

Habitat 
The plant grows in heavy soils, in fields where there is ample sunlight and where there is plenty of rainfall. In Israel / Palestine, it also grows on chalkstone terraces, as well as on loess soil. It is found growing in, both, cultivated and uncultivated fields, in garrigue, and in almost every place of the country.

Toxicology 
The stems, bulbous root, seeds (contained within 1–5 separate follicles) and leaves of the plant all contain toxins, namely, saponins and alkaloids that act on the nervous system and suppress it. The toxins are harmful to livestock when consumed by them, and have been known to pass through drinking milk, or by eating the flesh of animals that have eaten from the plant.

Medieval physician, Al-Tamimi, mentions a plant of its description growing in Palestine, and where he states that in Greater Syria (the Levant) the plant was given as an antidote to those bitten by venomous snakes and to persons stung by scorpions, the plant being ingested by them in the form of an elixir or potion, and the neurological reaction being such that it automatically cured all patients bitten or stung by these venomous creatures. Science today has yet to test the effects of the plant's toxins on treating snake-bites.

A similar species of Delphinium grows in the Levant, viz., Delphinium ithaburense (Boiss.), which is distinct from its sister the violet larkspur by its fleshy-pink colour and hairy flowers.

References

Bibliography

 (first edition 1976)

External links
The Plant List: Delphinium peregrinum
Encyclopedia of Life, s.v. Delphinium peregrinum
Photo Gallery of Delphinium peregrinum (Jungle Dragon)

peregrinum
Flora of Turkey
Flora of Israel
Flora of Lebanon
Flora of Palestine (region)
Medicinal plants of Asia
Taxa named by Carl Linnaeus
Plants described in 1753
Poisonous plants